Boris: The Film is a 2011 Italian comedy film directed by Giacomo Ciarrapico, Mattia Torre and Luca Vendruscolo. It is based on the television series Boris.

Cast

References

External links
 

2011 films
2011 comedy films
2010s Italian-language films
Films about filmmaking
Films based on television series
Italian comedy films
2010s Italian films